WWE (formerly World Wrestling Federation and World Wrestling Entertainment), an American professional wrestling promotion based in Stamford, Connecticut in the United States owned by the McMahon family, has been promoting events in Canada since its founding in 1980.

History
On January 24, 1963, Toots Mondt of the Capitol Wrestling Corporation (CWC) got into a dispute with the National Wrestling Alliance (NWA) over "Nature Boy" Buddy Rogers losing the NWA World Heavyweight Championship to Lou Thesz in a one-fall match in Toronto, Ontario, Canada. This disagree led to Mondt, McMahon, and the CWC leaving the NWA in protest, creating the World Wide Wrestling Federation (the predecessor to the WWE) in the process.

In 1984 Vince McMahon purchased Stampede Wrestling, before selling it back the following year. Also in 1984, WWF acquired Maple Leaf Wrestling, and continued to run it for a couple of years. In 1986 Maple Leaf Wrestling was shut down, and the name was used for the Canadian broadcasts of WWF Superstars of Wrestling.

In 1985 WWF created the WWF Canadian Championship, which was given to Dino Bravo. Bravo was the Canadian International Heavyweight Championship for many years for Lutte Internationale. Due to his previous success, Bravo  was billed as the WWF Canadian Champion in some Canadian cities until January 1986, when the title was abandoned.

In 1986 WWF hosted The Big Event in Toronto which drew over 74,000 fans. Ten years later, the WWF held an anniversary show of The Big Event, WWF Xperience, which drew over 21,000 fans.

In 1997 Survivor Series was broadcast from Montreal and is infamous for the Montreal Screwjob.

WrestleMania X8 in 2002 set the attendance record for an indoor event in Canada, at the Rogers Centre 68,236 people.

In 2019, Montreal hosted the 2019 WWE Superstar Shake-up.

Broadcast
In its early days, WWF/E programming was shown on TSN for Monday Night Raw and The Score for SmackDown! broadcasts. The programs were also aired on CHCH Hamilton, CJNT Montreal, CKMI Quebec and CKVR Barrie. ECW and NXT were seen on Global Television Network until 2010.

Beginning in 2014, WWE content is distributed exclusively via Rogers Media. As part of this agreement, Rogers distributes WWE's weekly television shows, Raw, SmackDown, NXT, Main Event, and This Week in WWE on Sportsnet 360. 
This deal excludes reality series, such as Total Divas (which is produced for E! and shown on its Canadian counterpart owned by Bell Media).

As part of this deal, the WWE Network's live stream was offered as a traditional TV channel for subscribers to cable providers, instead of a standalone service.

On September 7, 2017, WWE and TVA Sports announced a multi-year agreement to air a weekly recap of Raw in French.

Pay-per-view/WWE Network events

Weekly Television shows

1995-2000

2001-2010

2011-present

References

 
WWE international